USS Mount Hood may refer to the following ships of the United States Navy:

 , an ammunition ship in service during World War II in the Pacific Ocean
 , an ammunition ship in service from 1971 to 1999

United States Navy ship names